Donald Lewis Barnhart, Jr. (born July 2, 1963) is an American comedian, actor, writer and filmmaker who stars in his own nightly comedy show in Las Vegas author, actor, filmmaker and hypnotist.  Barnhart just released his new Dry Bar Comedy Special "The Spinal Disintegration of Man" from VidAngel which is going viral and has his own nightly residency in Las Vegas.  

Barnhart also stars in the documentary I Am Battle Comic, about the importance of entertaining the troops around the world and was the inspiration for the movie. He directed, produced and stars in Jokesters TV, The Freedom of Speech Comedy Series, The Ice House Anniversary Show, The DeEvolution of Man, Class Clowns, China Dolls and more.  Barnhart appears in Tribute to Fluffy, plays a psychotic mad man in Max Justice and appeared in the indie film Vicious Lips.  He even supported his rise in comedy by doing background work on Apollo 13, In The Army Now and Friends.

Barnhart's is a comedian and when he's not on tour, Don has his own nightly show in Las Vegas at The OYO Hotel & Casino.  He stars in the new sitcom, Class Clowns and the upcoming film Reefer Rendum. His first credits were during the comedy boom of the 80s appearing in MTV's 1/2 Hour Comedy Hour, An Evening at The Improv and Star Search.  He is also a Certified Hypnotist and published author and founder of The Las Vegas Comedy Institute where he teaches stand up, improv and comedy writing to the next generation of comedy stars.

He also stars in Finding The Funny, the documentary on teaching stand-up comedy directed by John Bizarre.

Don Barnhart is the owner and resident headliner at Jokesters Comedy Club features which features a rotating cast of professional comics and some of the best local talent opening the show. Jokesters Comedy Club also showcases comedians from around the world and many that you may have seen on Comedy Central, HBO, The Tonight Show, Dry Bar Comedy, Conan, Late Night, BET, Showtime, Netflix, The Bob & Tom Show, Howard Stern, YouTube, Amazon and more.

Since opening, Jokesters Comedy Club received the "Best Comedy Club" Silver Award from the Las Vegas Review Journal, named "Best New Show" by Vegas.com and last summer, Mayor Carolyn Goodman proclaimed Jokesters Day in Las Vegas celebrating their 1000th show.  Mayor Goodman congratulated Barnhart saying, "Special thanks are extended to Don Barnhart and all performers for entertaining residents and visitors. Please keep the laughs coming as we offer best wishes for the next 1,000 shows and beyond."

Audiences say Don's wit reminds them of a young George Carlin with an animated delivery. "Don Barnhart is a refreshing voice in the standup genre as he mixes a blend of hysterically funny and topical insights about our life and the world around us, pushing the boundaries of the PC culture without being offensive using well-written material delivering it with an improvisational flair."

For years, Barnhart has made a living headlining the top Comedy Clubs, cruise ships, corporate events, shows for the military and venues in Las Vegas and Don has notoriously performed clean and now he's letting loose and pulling no punches. He added, "I've always felt that dirty comics aren't always funny but funny comics can be dirty."

References 

https://www.broadwayworld.com/las-vegas/article/Comedian-Don-Barnhart-to-Reopen-Jokesters-Comedy-Club-In-Las-Vegas-20200221

External links
 
 Jokesters Las Vegas
 Battle Comics Web Site
 

American male comedians
21st-century American comedians
1963 births
Living people